The Gallant Fool is a 1933 American Western film directed by Robert N. Bradbury and starring Bob Steele, Arletta Duncan and George 'Gabby' Hayes.

Cast
Bob Steele as Kit Denton 
Arletta Duncan as Alecia Russo 
George 'Gabby' Hayes as Dad Denton 
Theodore Lorch as Rainey 
John Elliott as Chris McDonald 
Perry Murdock as Connors - Henchman 
Pascale Perry as Jim Leyton 
George Nash as Foils Pickpocket

References

External links

1933 Western (genre) films
American Western (genre) films
Monogram Pictures films
Films directed by Robert N. Bradbury
American black-and-white films
Films with screenplays by Harry L. Fraser
1930s American films